The 2011–12 season was the 114th season of professional association football played by Bristol City F.C., an association football club based in Bristol, England. They competed in the Championship, alongside the FA Cup, the Football League Cup and the Football League Trophy.

League table

Squad

Statistics

|-
|colspan="14"|Players featured for club who have left:

              

|}

Goalscoring record

Disciplinary record

Suspensions served

International call-ups

Results

Pre-season friendlies

Championship

FA Cup 
Bristol City's FA Cup Third Round tie was drawn away to Crawley Town as Ball Number 5 (City) and Ball Number 51 (Crawley) respectively, the tie was played on 7 January 2012, with a kick-off time at 15:00. City lost by a single goal to Crawley from a Matt Tubbs goal.

League Cup 
Bristol City's League Cup Round 1 tie against Swindon, drawn to be played on 9 August 2011, was postponed on police advice. This was due to fears of safety issues following rioting in London. The game was set to a new date 24 August 2011. City lost by a single goal to Swindon from a De Vita goal.

Transfers

In

Notes1Although officially undisclosed Bristol Evening Post believed the deal to be around £50,000.
2Although officially undisclosed Soccerbase listed the deal as be worth £250,000.

Loans in

Out

Loans out

Overall summary

Summary

Competition summary

References

2011–12
2011–12 Football League Championship by team